United Nurses Association (UNA) is a professional association of registered nurses in India. It was started in Kerala. The organisation discusses problems faced by nurses in their working environment.

History 
Kerala nurses first joined at Thrissur district. The first meeting was about the increased threat of seizing the assets of nursing students who had taken educational loans. Then, Beena Baby, a Malayalee nurse, committed suicide while working at a hospital in Mumbai due to staff bullying, illegal management practices and bond issues. The so-called "bond system" executed by the Mumbai based hospital was an indirect violation of the Bonded Labor System (Abolition) Act, 1976. Ms Baby's death triggered a public outcry, leading to the formation of "UNA", along with many other nurse associations.

United Nurses Association was created by Jasminsha and six other working nurses of Thrissur on 16 November 2011. UNA gained awareness among nurses and society through social media.

Achievements 
United Nurses Association contains 5.5 lakh family members as working and retired nurses in Kerala state. Another 3.5 lakh members joined from outside Kerala. Approximately another 9 lakh people are in members' families. UNA campaigns extended protection to all hospital staff members, expanding membership.  The organization increased minimum nursing salaries from Rs.2000 to Rs.20000 as a result of strikes. UNA has committees in every district of Kerala and 457 hospital units work under the 14 district committees.

The organisation has support in many states including Delhi, Maharashtra, Karnataka, Tamil Nadu, Karnataka, Uttar Pradesh, Telangana, Andhra Pradesh, Himachal Pradesh, Kashmir, Goa, Paschima Bengal, Bihar, Manipur and Rajasthan. 400 units are active in these states. In Delhi alone, UNA has 12,623 members and 6,000 permanent members among 137 units situated at Delhi NCR. The Maharashtra state committee includes 11,020 family members and 48 strong units in Mumbai and Pune. Karnataka state committee includes 7,813 members.

The organisation has an active National Committee that includes every state representative, led by Jasminsha, President and Sudheep M.V, General Secretary.

United Nurses Association has coordination committees and affiliated associations in countries including Qatar, UAE, Saudi Arabia, Canada, New Zealand, Libiya, Switzerland, Malaysia, Bahrain, US, Oman, Malta and South Africa.  

The organisation actively participates in charity activities beyond the nursing community.

Chartered flights
During the COVID-19 pandemic, United Nurses Association arranged chartered flights for stranded nurses in Saudi Arabia in association with Avas charitable trust. The chartered flights were coordinated by Mr. Jithin Lohi international coordinator, Mr. Jasminsha President and the leaders of UNA. The coordinations successfully handled only with the help of Whatsapp groups. The first chartered flight from Saudi was on 7 June 2020, from Riyadh to Kochi. Since then UNA had successfully scheduled and executed seven chartered flights from Riyad, Dammam and Jeddah.

See also

 Nursing in India
 Healthcare in India

References

External links
 https://www.onmanorama.com/news/kerala/2018/02/15/nurses-strike-cherthala-kvm-hospital.html

Professional associations based in India
Nursing organizations
Nursing in India
Organizations established in 2011
Organisations based in Thrissur
2011 establishments in Kerala
Healthcare trade unions in India